Surrend: Arts in hotspots is the name of a Danish street art group consisting of artist and teacher at the Royal Danish Academy of Art Jan Egesborg and artist and journalist Pia Bertelsen.

The group, which was formed during the funeral of former Serbian president Slobodan Milosevic in the winter of 2006, exists to poke fun at some of the world’s powerful men. It is an independent art group, unaffiliated with either NGO or political party.

Surrend mainly uses the street as its exhibition space and stickers with ironic texts as its main medium of expression. In December 2006 Surrend went beyond its usual medium by placing an advertisement in a small Tehran newspaper with an insulting but hidden message describing the Iranian president Mahmoud Ahmadinejad with the acronym "SWINE".  The Surrend project is planned to consist of 20 different destinations, culminating with a gallery exhibition in Copenhagen. So far Surrend has been to Serbia, Belarus, Turkey and Poland, Sri Lanka and the Faroe Islands.

External links 
 Danes launch art attack on Mladic, BBC 14 April 2006. Last accessed 20 December 2006.
 In Sri Lanka this week two Danish artists spread their message of peace through satirical stickers, The Sunday Times 8 October 2006. Last accessed 20 December 2006.
 Official Surrend site. Last accessed 20 December 2006.
 Danish art group pokes fun at Iranian president The Scotsman, 20 December 2006. Last accessed 20 December 2006.

Danish artist groups and collectives
Modern art
Graffiti and unauthorised signage
Royal Danish Academy of Fine Arts